The Dream Girl was a 1916 American silent drama film directed by Cecil B. DeMille. Based on an original story by DeMille writer Jeanie MacPherson, the film starred Mae Murray and Theodore Roberts. The film is now considered lost.

Cast
 Mae Murray as Meg Dugan
 Theodore Roberts as Jim Dugan
 Earle Foxe as Tom Merton
 James Neill as Benjamin Merton
 Charles West as 'English' Hal
 Mary Mersch as Alice Merton
 Mrs. Lewis McCord as Character Woman

See also
List of lost films

References

External links

The Dream Girl at SilentEra

1916 films
1916 drama films
1916 lost films
Silent American drama films
American silent feature films
American black-and-white films
Famous Players-Lasky films
Films directed by Cecil B. DeMille
Lost American films
Paramount Pictures films
Lost drama films
1910s American films